Ferdinand Zecca (19 February 1864  – 23 March 1947) was a pioneer French film director, film producer, actor and screenwriter. He worked primarily for the Pathé company, first in artistic endeavors then in administration of the internationally based company.

Early life
Ferdinand Louis Zecca was born in Paris on 19 February 1864 into a family steeped in the entertainment world. His father was the stage manager at the Paris Théâtre de l'Ambigu while his brothers were actors.   Zecca also became a stage manager and then an actor, before working as an entertainer, playing the cornet and singing in Parisian cafés. He was playing the cornet at the Foire au Pain d'épices, when he encountered filmmaker Léon Gaumont.

Filmmaking
From 1891, Zecca had worked occasionally recording voice-overs for phonograph records for the Pathé Frères company, a pioneer in the cinema and audio recording industries. After 1895, Pathé became more involved in cinema. Gaumont first hired Zecca as an actor in 1898 but Zecca directed his first film for Pathé, an experimental sound production, Le Muet mélomane (1899) based on a musical  Zecca and another artist, Charlus, were performing. At the request of entrepreneur Georges Dufayel, owner of the Grands Magasins Dufayel, they acted the piece before a ciné camera. His next film, Les Méfaits d'une tête de veau (1899) was for Gaumont.

In 1900, unable to personally do the work, Charles Pathé had Zecca set up the Pathé pavilion in the Paris World Fair (Exposition Universelle). After seeing his work, Pathé offered Zecca a position in his film company in Vincennes, first as an assistant to a director. Engaging Zecca "for a few weeks", he quickly became Pathé's right-hand man and was soon creating and directing his own films.

Zecca explored many themes from the mundane to the fantastic. In À la conquête de l'air (1901), a strange flying machine, called Fend-l'air, was seen flying over the rooftops of Belleville. By using trick photography, the one-minute short was notable in being the first aviation film, predating the flight by the Wright Brothers by two years.  

Zecca also pioneered one of the first crime dramas, Histoire d'un crime (1901), stylistically innovative in its use of superimposition. The story was of a man condemned to death, awaiting execution with his crimes appearing on his cell wall. The film is an early example of flashbacks as a film device. Other films included comedies, trick films or fairy tales, such as Les Sept châteaux du Diable, both 1901, and La Belle au bois dormant in 1902, as well as social dramas like Les Victimes de l'alcoolisme (1902), Au pays noir (1905) and reconstructions of actual events, the most famous being La Catastrophe de la Martinique (1902). 

Zecca acted in many of his films. At the end of 1906, assisted by the Spaniard Segundo de Chomón's photography and special effects, Zecca continued to experiment. He co-directed La Vie et la passion de Jésus Christ (1903), which, at a running time of 44 minutes, was one of the first feature-length films about Jesus. He started filming in colour, with second Vie et Passion de N.S. Jésus Christ, shot in four parts with 38 scenes, 990 metres long, which was finished in 1907. 

Between 1900 and 1907, Zecca oversaw the production of hundreds of Pathé films from many important Pathé directors including Nonguet Lucien, Gaston Velle, Albert Capellani, Louis J. Gasnier, André Heuzé and Henri Pouctal. Zecca also acted, directed, produced, and, on occasion, wrote films. After Pathé bought the rights to Star films, Zecca started editing films by George Méliès. 

Appointed Managing Director of Pathé in 1905, in 1913 Zecca was sent to the United States to take charge of the American Pathé production house. He returned to France in 1919, where as a co-director with René Leprincee, he made Le Calvaire d'une reine, his last film. In the same year, Zecca was appointed to head the Pathé-Baby division, producing equipment and cameras for thin film, where he worked until his retirement in 1939.

In March 1947 at the age of 83, in his residence at Saint-Mandé, France, Ferdinand Zecca died.

Filmography
as director
1899: Les Mésaventures d'un muet mélomane (Le Muet mélomane)
1899: Les Méfaits d'une tête de veau
1901: Une tempête dans une chambre à coucher
1901: Une idylle sous un tunnel
1901: Un duel abracadabrant
1901: Un drame au fond de la mer
1901: La Soupière merveilleuse
1901: Les Sept Châteaux du diable
1901: Rêve et Réalité
1901: Plongeur fantastique
1901: Par le trou de la serrure
1901: La Mégère récalcitrante
1901: Le Mauvais Riche
1901: La Loupe de grand-maman
1901: L'Illusionniste mondain
1901: Histoire d'un crime
1901: L'Enfant Prodigue
1901: Comment on met son couvert
1901: Comment Fabien devient architecte
1901: Scènes vues de mon balcon (Ce que je vois de mon sixième)
1901: À la conquête de l'air
1901: L'Agent plongeur
1901: Une discussion politique
1901: Quo Vadis?
1902: Les Victimes de l'alcoolisme
1902: Une séance de cinématographe
1902: La Fée des roches noires
1902: Le Conférencier distrait
1902: Chez le photographe
1902: La Catastrophe de la Martinique
1902: La Belle au bois dormant (coréalisation de Lucien Nonguet)
1902: Baignade impossible
1902: L'Assommoir
1902: L'Affaire Dreyfus
1902: La Poule merveilleuse
1902: Ali Baba et les quarante voleurs
1902: L'Assassinat du duc de Guise
1903: Samson et Dalila
1903: Repas infernal
1903: La Soubrette ingénieuse
1903: Le Chien et la Pipe
1903: Le Premier Cigare du collégien
1903: Le Démon du jeu ou la Vie d'un joueur (La Vie d'un joueur)
1903: Les Aventures de Don Quichotte (Don Quichotte) (coréalisation de Lucien Nonguet)
1903: Le Chat botté (coréalisation de Lucien Nonguet)
1904: The Wrong Door
1904: Le Portrait
1904: Les Petits Coupeurs de bois vert
1904: Le Pêcheur de perles
1904: Annie's Love Story
1904: La Grève
1905: La Passion de Notre-Seigneur Jésus Christ (La Vie et la Passion de Jésus Christ)
1905: Un drame à Venise
1905: Rêve à la lune (coréalisation de Gaston Velle)1905: Le Remords1905: La Course aux tonneaux1905: Automobile et Cul-de-jatte1905: Au Pays Noir1905: Au bagne1905: L'alcool engendre la tuberculose1905: L'Incendiaire1905: Dix femmes pour un mari (coréalisation de Georges Hatot et Lucien Nonguet)1905: L'Honneur d'un père1905: Vendetta1905: Les Apaches de Paris1905: Brigandage moderne1907: Le Spectre rouge (coréalisation de Segundo de Chomón)1907: Le Poil à gratter1907: Métempsycose1907: L'Homme Protée1907: La Course des sergents de ville1908: Samson (coréalisation d'Henri Andréani)1908: Le Rêve d'agent1908: L'Affaire Dreyfus1909: Le Caprice du vainqueur1910: La Tragique Aventure de Robert le Taciturne, duc d'Aquitaine1910: Slippery Jim1910: Cléopâtre (coréalisation d'Henri Andréani)1910: 1812, (coréalisation de Camille de Morlhon)All films below are co-directed by René Leprincee
1912: La Fièvre de l'or1913: Le Roi de l'air1913: La Leçon du gouffre1913: La Comtesse noire1913: Cœur de femme1913: Plus fort que la haine (film, 1913)1914: La Danse héroïque1914: La Lutte pour la vie1914: La Jolie Bretonne1914: L'Étoile du génie1915: Le Vieux Cabotin1915: Le Noël d'un vagabond1919: Les Larmes du pardon1919: Le Calvaire d'une reineAs producer
1901: Scènes vues de mon balcon (Ce que je vois de mon sixième)1901: À la conquête de l'air1903: Le Démon du jeu ou La vie d'un joueur (La Vie d'un joueur)1906: Pauvre Mère1906: La Grève des bonnes1907: Cendrillon, ou la Pantoufle merveilleuse (Cendrillon) d'Albert Capellani1907: Les Débuts d'un patineur1908: Don Juan1912: Boireau, roi de la boxe1913: Les Incohérences de Boireau1913: Boireau empoisonneur1913: Boireau spadassinas actor
1899: Les Mésaventures d'une tête mélomane (Le Muet mélomane)1901: Une idylle sous un tunnel1901: Histoire d'un crime1901: Comment on met son couvert1901: À la conquête de l'air1902: Une séance de cinématographe1902: Chez le photographe1902: La Poule merveilleuse1905: L'Amant de la lune (Rêve à la lune): Le pochard1905: Automobile et cul-de-jatte1905: Créations renversantes1912: Rigadin aux Balkansas writer
1901: Histoire d'un crime1902: Les Victimes de l'alcoolisme1903: Le Démon du jeu ou La vie d'un joueur (La Vie d'un joueur)1905: L'Amant de la lune (Rêve à la lune)1906: Le Théâtre de Bob1910: La Tragique aventure de Robert le Taciturne, duc d'Aquitaine1915: Le Malheur qui passeSee alsoHistoire d'un crimeReferences
Notes

Citations

Bibliography

 Gordon, Rae Beth. Why the French Love Jerry Lewis: From Cabaret to Early Cinema. Palo Alto, California:Stanford University Press, 2002. .
 Paris, Michael. From the Wright Brothers to Top gun: Aviation, Nationalism, and Popular Cinema. Manchester, UK: Manchester University Press, 1995. .
 Rège, Philippe. Encyclopedia of French Film Directors'', Volume 1. Lanham, Maryland: Scarecrow Press, 2009. .

External links
  Les gens d cinéma
 
 

1864 births
1947 deaths
Fantasy film directors
French film directors
Silent film directors